Jhawarian is a town located near the Jhelum River in Sargodha District of Punjab, Pakistan.

The village's history extends back to six hundred years, when the district was settled by Bhatti Rajput tribes people migrating from Pindi Bhatian. The agricultural possibilities of the place and the proximity of the river made it suitable for settlement. A police station in the village dates back to 1905, and was built by the British administration of the Punjab.

Jhawarian is located on the Sher Shah Suri highway, between Shah Pur and Behra, and three kilometres from Kalra village, which used to be the landed estate of  late General Sir Malik Omar Hayat Tiwana and his son Malik Khizar Hayat Tiwana.

References

Populated places in Sargodha District